Rhostrehwfa is a village in southern-central Anglesey, located southwest of Llangefni. To the southeast is the Malltraeth Marsh. It is situated at a prominent point on the crest of a ridge overlooking the River Cefni valley to the south. It contains the Capel Pisgah and several holiday cottages.
It is in the community of Llangristiolus and the Bodffordd electoral ward.

References

Villages in Anglesey
Llangristiolus